Love Happens may refer to:

 Love Happens (1999 film), an American romantic comedy film starring Megyn Price and Ken Marino
 Love Happens (2009 film), an American romantic drama film starring Aaron Eckhart and Jennifer Aniston
 ...When Love Happens, a 2014 Nigerian romantic comedy film